William Nicholson JP (2 September 1824 – 25 July 1909) was an English distiller and Liberal Party politician who sat in the House of Commons in two periods between 1866 and 1885, and later joined the Conservative Party. He was also an English amateur cricketer who played first-class cricket from 1845 to 1869.

Early life and education 
Nicholson was born at Upper Holloway, London, the son of John Nicholson of Upper Clapton, Middlesex and his wife Ellen Payne daughter of Richard Payne. He was educated at Harrow and Trinity College, Cambridge. He was a member of the family which owned the J&W Nicholson & Co gin distillery based in Clerkenwell and Three Mills. He was mainly associated with Marylebone Cricket Club (MCC), of which he was a prominent member; and with Middlesex and Middlesex County Cricket Club (founded during his career in 1863). He was a right-handed batsman and a wicketkeeper who made 148 known appearances in first-class matches, including a number of appearances for the Gentlemen between 1846 and 1858.

Nicholson became a director and then chairman of the distillery and was a benefactor of cricket. In 1863 he acquired Basing Park, Alton, Hampshire. In 1866, when MCC finally purchased the freehold of Lord's Ground, they paid £18,333 6s 8d using money advanced by Nicholson. He was president of the MCC in 1879. In 1888 Nicholson loaned further monies to secure Henderson's Nursery and in 1889, when the foundation stone was laid for the new Lord's Pavilion, it was paid for by a £21,000 loan from Nicholson.

Member of Parliament, 1866-85 
In July 1866 Nicholson was elected unopposed as the Member of Parliament (MP) for the borough of Petersfield in Hampshire, at a by-election caused by the elevation to the peerage of the Conservative MP Sir William Jolliffe. He was re-elected in 1868, but defeated at the 1874 general election. In 1878, he was High Sheriff of Hampshire. He was re-elected for Petersfield in the 1880 general election and held the seat until the parliamentary borough of Petersfield was disenfranchised under the Redistribution of Seats Act 1885. The name was transferred to a new county division of Hampshire. With a wider geographical area, and a franchise expanded under the Representation of the People Act 1884, the new seat had an electorate more than ten times larger, expanded from 801 in 1880 to 8,202 in 1885. In April 1885 Nicholson announced his resignation from the Liberal Party, stating that he would contest the next election as a Liberal-Conservative. He was adopted by the local Conservative association as their candidate, but at the general election in December that year he lost the seat by a narrow margin to the Liberal candidate Viscount Wolmer, and was defeated again at the 1886 election.

Distillery accident 

On 12 July 1901, Nicholson's 29-year-old son Godfrey Maule Nicholson, managing director of the distillery and brother-in-law to Sir Edward Bradford, Chief Commissioner of the Metropolitan Police, died, along with two other distillery staff, while trying to rescue a distillery worker, Thomas Pickett, who had been overcome by carbon dioxide while investigating a well.  The 'Helping Hands' memorial at Three Mills Green commemorates this tragedy, as does a plaque in Postman's Park.

Personal life 

Nicholson married Isabella Sarah Meek, daughter of John Meek in 1858. They had fourteen children including a son William Graham Nicholson who was subsequently MP for Petersfield from 1897 to 1935. Another son Brigadier-General John Sanctuary Nicholson became MP for Westminster Abbey from 1921 to 1924 after a career in the army.

He was a J.P. and Deputy Lieutenant for Hampshire

Nicholson died at Westminster, Central London at the age of 83.

References

Bibliography
 Derek Birley, A Social History of English Cricket, Aurum, 1999
 Arthur Haygarth, Scores & Biographies, several volumes, Lillywhite, 1862–72

External links

 

1825 births
1909 deaths
Liberal Party (UK) MPs for English constituencies
UK MPs 1865–1868
UK MPs 1868–1874
UK MPs 1880–1885
English cricketers
English cricketers of 1826 to 1863
English cricketers of 1864 to 1889
Marylebone Cricket Club cricketers
Middlesex cricketers
Gentlemen cricketers
People educated at Harrow School
Alumni of Trinity College, Cambridge
High Sheriffs of Hampshire
Deputy Lieutenants of Hampshire
Married v Single cricketers
Gentlemen of the South cricketers
Non-international England cricketers
Presidents of the Marylebone Cricket Club
Gentlemen of England cricketers
North v South cricketers
Over 30s v Under 30s cricketers
Fast v Slow cricketers
Gentlemen of Marylebone Cricket Club cricketers